The South African national cricket team was meant to tour England over the 1970 English summer. However, the tour was cancelled after protests from the anti-apartheid movement.

It was replaced by a Rest of the World team.

South African squad

Revised tour schedule
The original tour schedule contained 28 matches. The Cricket Council, the governing body of English cricket, met at Lord’s on 12 February 1970 when they decided to revise the tour programme cutting it from 28 to 12 matches. Grounds at which the police would find it difficult to maintain order were excluded from the itinerary. The fixture list was published in that year’s Wisden Cricketers' Almanack.

References

External links
Tour details at Test Cricket Tours
BBC article on the tour 
Cricinfo article on tour

Further reading
 Mark Rowe, Tour de Farce: Anti-Apartheid Protest and South Africa's Cancelled 1970 Cricket Tour of England (2020)
 Arunabha Sengupta, Apartheid: A Point to Cover (2020) 
 Colin Shindler, Barbed Wire and Cucumber Sandwiches: The Controversial South African Tour of 1970 (2020)

South African cricket seasons from 1970–71 to 1999–2000
Cricket and apartheid
South Africa–United Kingdom relations